George Turner (2 April 1841 – 29 March 1910) was an English landscape artist and farmer who has been called "Derbyshire's John Constable".

Life and work
Turner was born in Cromford, Derbyshire in England, but then moved to Derby with his family. He showed an early talent for music and art - encouraged by his father Thomas Turner, who although a tailor by profession was also an art enthusiast. Turner was largely self-taught and went on to become a professional painter and art teacher.

Turner lived in Derbyshire all his life. In 1865 he married Eliza Lakin (1837 - 1900), becoming a part-time farmer and raising four children at Walnut farm in Barrow upon Trent. He had a number of successful students including David Payne and Louis Bosworth Hurt.

After Eliza's death in 1900, he moved to Kirk Ireton and later married fellow artist Kate Stevens Smith (1871-1964) - they set up home in Idridgehay where he died in 1910. His son William Lakin Turner (1867-1936) also became a landscape oil painter.

Turner worked in oils and painted bucolic scenes mainly of his native Derbyshire, leaving an important legacy of hundreds of pictures depicting the English countryside before the coming of mechanisation, the motor car and urban expansion. His work was exhibited in Nottingham and Birmingham. Turner served on the Art Committee of Derby Art Gallery and both his and his son's paintings are included in the city's collection. Turner has 22 paintings in national collections in the United Kingdom.

Notes

Further reading

Long, Frederick J. George Turner the Derbyshire Artist, 1841-1910 (1995)

External links and references

George Turner - 'Derbyshire's John Constable' (bygonederbyshire.co.uk - retrieved on 25 Feb 2010)
George Turner on ArtUK website
George Turner on Artnet
Works by George Turner (Art Renewal Center)
Derbyshire artists ("Derbyshire, UK")
Windley Brook, Derbyshire (1899 - Christie's)
Shepherd and Flock by the Trent (Langham gallery)

19th-century English painters
English male painters
20th-century English painters
Landscape artists
People from Cromford
1841 births
1910 deaths
People associated with Derby Museum and Art Gallery
People from Derby
People from South Derbyshire District
20th-century English male artists
19th-century English male artists